American rock band The Rapture has released four studio albums, two extended plays, and thirteen singles.

The band first released their mini-album Mirror in 1999 under Gravity Records. This project did not chart in any countries. In 2002, the band released the song "House of Jealous Lovers", which originally didn't chart in any countries, but due to a re-recorded re-release of the song in 2003, it peaked at 27 on the UK Singles Chart. Later that year, the Rapture released their debut full-length studio album Echoes under DFA Records. After parting ways with the DFA, the band released their second full-length studio album, titled Pieces of the People We Love, in 2006. After a short hiatus, the band signed with DFA again and released In the Grace of Your Love in 2011. The Rapture officially disbanded in 2014.

Albums

Studio albums

Mini-album

Extended plays

Singles

Split singles

Music videos

Other appearances

References

Discographies of American artists
Rock music group discographies